Andrea Komáriková (born 24 July 1978) is a Slovak former footballer who played as a forward. She has been a member of the Slovakia women's national team.

References

1978 births
Living people
Women's association football forwards
Slovak women's footballers
Slovakia women's international footballers